Deh-e Bala (also Romanized as Deh-e Bālā, Deh Bāla, and Deh Bālā) is a village in Surmaq Rural District, in the Central District of Abadeh County, Fars Province, Iran. At the 2006 census, its population was 204, in 58 families.

References 

Populated places in Abadeh County